Coronado is a 1935 American comedy film directed by Norman Z. McLeod and written by Don Hartman and Frank Butler. The film stars Johnny Downs Betty Burgess, Jack Haley, Andy Devine, Leon Errol, Alice White and Eddy Duchin. The film was released on November 29, 1935, by Paramount Pictures.

Plot

Cast
Johnny Downs as Johnny Marvin
Betty Burgess as June Wray
Jack Haley as Chuck Hornbostel
Andy Devine as Pinky Falls
Leon Errol as Otto Wray
Alice White as Violet Wray Hornbostel
Eddy Duchin as Eddie 
Eddy Duchin's Orchestra as Eddie's Orchestra
Jameson Thomas as Carlton
Berton Churchill as Walter Marvin
Nella Walker as Mrs. Gloria Marvin
Julie Bishop as Barbara Forrest 
James Burke as Slug Moran
James B. Carson as Marine

References

External links
 

1935 films
American comedy films
1935 comedy films
Paramount Pictures films
Films directed by Norman Z. McLeod
American black-and-white films
1930s English-language films
1930s American films